Mathías Alexander Acuña Maciel  (born 28 November 1992) is a Uruguayan professional footballer who last played as a forward for Greek Super League 2 club AEL.

Personal life
Before becoming a footballer, Acuña worked as a delivery man and musician. es pareja de lucia Rodríguez de las piedras

References

External links
 Mathías Acuña at Soccerway

Living people
Uruguayan footballers
1992 births
Association football forwards
Footballers from Montevideo
El Tanque Sisley players
Central Español players
Liverpool F.C. (Montevideo) players
Montevideo Wanderers F.C. players